Sylvester "Sy" Blye (born February 14, 1938) is a former American street and professional basketball player.

Blye was famous in the Rucker Park league in New York City, being named to its Hall of Fame. He played briefly in college for Seattle University, before officials found he had played professionally for the Harlem Clowns and at West Hills College Coalinga in California.

He also starred for the Philadelphia/Washington/New York Tapers of the professional American Basketball League. In the 1962/63 season, he scored the 4th most points. Blye is also 5th in career points and 7th in career rebounds in the ABL.

ABL Statistics

References

1938 births
Living people